Aulus Atilius may refer to either of two Ancient Roman politicians:

 Aulus Atilius Calatinus (d. by 216 BCE)
 Aulus Atilius Serranus (fl. 170 BCE)